Theodora of Khazaria (Greek: Θεοδώρα τῶν Χαζάρων) was Byzantine empress as the second wife of Justinian II. She was a sister of Busir, khagan of the Khazars, but their relation to other Khazar rulers such as Bihar, father of the future Empress Tzitzak, is unknown.

Marriage 
Justinian II had first succeeded to the throne in 685. In 695, Justinian was deposed by a coup d'état under strategos Leontius. Justinian's nose and tongue were slit and he was exiled to Cherson in the Crimea.

Justinian stayed in Cherson for about seven years with no apparent incident. However rumors that the deposed emperor was plotting his restoration came to the attention of the city authorities c. 702. They  decided to arrest and send him to Constantinople, surrendering his fate to Tiberius III. Justinian instead escaped Cherson and sought refuge in the court of Busir.

Busir welcomed the exile and formed a familial relation to Justinian by marrying him to his sister, whose original name is unknown, in 703. Theodora was her baptismal name and marks her conversion to Chalcedonian Christianity. The name was probably chosen to evoke memories of Theodora, wife of Justinian I. Busir provided the couple with funds and a house in Phanagoria.

Tiberius eventually took notice of the new marital alliance and bribed Busir in exchange for the head of Justinian. According to the chronicle of Theophanes the Confessor, c. 704 Busir dispatched two agents to murder his brother-in-law, Balgitzin and Papatzys. Theodora became aware of their mission and warned her husband in advance, enabling him to strangle both men and sail in a fishing boat back to Cherson.

Theodora was left behind in the custody of her brother. Their only known son Tiberius is considered to have been born at some point during the separation of his parents, indicating Theodora was pregnant prior to the escape.

Empress 
In 705, Justinian formed a new alliance, this time with Tervel of Bulgaria. With an army of 15,000 horsemen provided by him, Justinian suddenly advanced on Constantinople and managed to gain entrance into the city. He deposed Tiberius III and regained his throne. Theodora was the new empress consort but was still in the custody of her brother.

According to the chronicle of Theophanes and the Chronographikon syntomon of Ecumenical Patriarch Nikephoros I of Constantinople, Justinian was planning to reclaim his wife by force. In 705/706, a detachment of the  Imperial navy was sent to the Sea of Azov to escort Theodora back, but the fleet was sunk by a storm before reaching their destination.

Busir wrote to his brother-in-law and informed him that war was unnecessary. He was free to reclaim Theodora as soon as he sent emissaries to escort her and, according to Theophanes, he also informed Justinian of the existence of his son, Tiberius. Theophylaktos, a koubikoularios, was sent to bring them back to Constantinople with no further incident. Theodora was crowned Augusta and Tiberius was proclaimed co-emperor to secure his succession rights.

Deposition 
During his second reign, Justinian proved to be merciless in his pursuit of vengeance against supporters of Leontius and Tiberius III. The growing discontent over his harsh rule would lead to further conflict for the throne. In 711, a new revolt started in Cherson under exiled general Bardanes, renamed Philippicus, and Busir lend his support to the rebels.

Justinian was absent in Armenia when the revolt started and was unable to return to Constantinople in time to defend it. He was arrested and executed outside the city in December 711, his head being sent to Bardanes as a trophy. On hearing the news of his death, Anastasia, Justinian's mother, took his six-year-old son and co-emperor, Tiberius, to sanctuary at St. Mary's Church in Blachernae, but was pursued by Philippicus' henchmen, who dragged the child from the altar and, once outside the church, murdered him, thus eradicating the line of Heraclius.

Whether Theodora was still alive during the events remains unclear. Theophanes and Nikephoros make no mention of her when recounting the deposition. Joannes Zonaras presumed her to be already deceased, but he was writing four centuries after the events and the factual accuracy of his statement is debatable. Unlike other empresses, there is no tomb mentioned for her and the year and manner of her death remains unknown.

Children 
Theodora and Justinian II had only one known child:

 Tiberius (c. 705 – 711, co-emperor from 706 to 711). Executed by orders of Philippicus.

References 

7th-century births
8th-century Byzantine empresses
8th-century deaths
Heraclian dynasty
Khazar people